The City of London was a parliamentary constituency of the Parliament of England until 1707.

Boundaries and history to 1707
This borough constituency consisted of the City of London, which was the historic core of the modern Greater London. In the twenty-first century, the City forms part of the London Region of England.

The southern boundary of the city is the north bank of the River Thames. The City of Westminster is situated to the west. The districts of Holborn and Finsbury are to the north, Shoreditch to the north-east and Whitechapel to the east.

Before 1298, the area was represented as part of the county constituency of Middlesex. The City formed part of the geographic county, even though from early times it was not administered as part of Middlesex.

London is first known to have been enfranchised and represented in Parliament in 1298. It was the most important city in England and was administered as a county of itself from before boroughs were first represented in Parliament. It received four seats in Parliament instead of the normal two for an English constituency. The extra two seats (whose holders were known as knights, like the representatives of a county) were supposed to represent the county-like status of London. No such extra seats were awarded to other cities or boroughs which received the status of being counties of themselves in later times.

By the sixteenth century it was the practice for the Court of Aldermen to summon a meeting at the Guildhall. The aldermen met and selected two candidates to sit as the city's knights in Parliament. One was normally an alderman (probably a former Lord Mayor of the City of London). The other was normally the Recorder of London, whose legal expertise was essential to the City which had a lot of legislation it wanted drafted and passed by Parliament. On one occasion in the sixteenth century the Recorder was already a burgess representing another borough in Parliament, so two aldermen were chosen.

The aldermen also prepared a list of twelve prominent Londoners, who were not themselves aldermen. The nominees for knight were then put to the liverymen, who had been waiting whilst the aldermen met, for approval and an election was held to select two citizens from the list of twelve nominees to fill the other two seats in the House of Commons. The London election thus took place in a single day.

If the Recorder resigned during a Parliament or a citizen was elected an alderman, he was disqualified and the new Recorder or another citizen (as the case might require) was elected.

At some point after 1603 the City adopted a more normal system for nominations and elections. The two London Sheriffs appointed a day for candidates nominations to be submitted, at a meeting in the Guildhall. If there were more than four candidates a poll was held at a later date which usually extended for several weeks. Although it was no longer a legal requirement, there was a custom that two City seats were filled by Aldermen and two by non-Aldermen.

During the Protectorate the City was allocated six seats in the House of Commons, under the terms of the Instrument of Government adopted on 15 December 1653. However, by the time the Third Protectorate Parliament assembled in 1659 the constituency had reverted to its traditional four seats.

The City of London was a densely populated area in the period up to 1707. The composition of the City electorate was not as democratic as that of some other borough constituencies, such as neighbouring Westminster. The right of election was held by members of the livery companies. However, the size and wealth of the community meant that it had more voters than most other borough constituencies. Only Westminster had a larger borough electorate. Duke Henning estimated the City liverymen at about 4,000 in 1661 and about 6,000 by 1680.

Members of the House of Commons

Some of the members elected during this period have been identified. The Roman numerals in brackets, following some names, are those used to distinguish different politicians of the same name in 'The House of Commons' 1509-1558 and 1558–1603. As there are considerable gaps between some of the parliaments in this period, each members career is sub-divided by parliament in the tables, even if he served in successive parliaments.

The elected date is for the City constituency. When an exact general election date is unavailable, the year or years between the dates of the parliament being summoned and assembling, are used.

1298–1385

1386–1421

1422–1508

Parliaments of King Henry VIII of England

Notes:

Parliaments of King Edward VI of England

Note:-

Parliaments of Queen Mary I of England

Parliaments of Queen Elizabeth I of England

Notes:-

Parliaments of King James I of England

Parliaments of King Charles I of England

Parliaments of the Commonwealth

The Long Parliament or the selection of members from it known as the Rump Parliament functioned de facto during part of the Commonwealth of England period. It existed (in a sense) de jure 1640–1660, as under a pre-English Civil War law, the Long Parliament could not be lawfully dissolved without its own consent which it did not give until 1660. As it was a parliament originally summoned by King Charles I, the overall dates of the Long Parliament are given in the previous section.

The Barebones Parliament was an appointed body, so the city was not an electoral constituency represented as such in it. That body was summoned on 20 June 1653, first met on 4 July 1653 and was dissolved on 12 December 1653.

Parliaments of the Protectorate

During the Protectorate the City was allocated six representatives in the First and the Second Protectorate Parliaments, before reverting to four for the Third Protectorate Parliament.

Knights and Citizens serving 1660–1707
Key to parties: T Tory; W Whig.

Notes:-

Elections

Election dates 1660–1710
Dates of general and by-elections from 1660 (excluding some general elections at which no new MP was returned).

Election results 1660–1690 

 Death of Fowke 22 April 1662

 Death of Love 1 May 1689

See also 
 Duration of English parliaments before 1660
 Duration of English, British and United Kingdom parliaments from 1660
 List of parliaments of England

References

  'Aldermen in Parliament', The Aldermen of the City of London: Temp. Henry III - 1912 (1908), pp. 261-297. Date accessed: 14 April 2011
 The House of Commons 1509-1558, by S.T. Bindoff (Secker & Warburg 1982)
 The House of Commons 1558-1603, by P.W. Hasler (HMSO 1981)
 The House of Commons 1660-1690, by Basil Duke Henning (Secker & Warburg 1983)

Politics of the City of London
Constituencies of the Parliament of the United Kingdom established in 1298
Constituencies of the Parliament of the United Kingdom disestablished in 1950
Political history of Middlesex
Parliamentary constituencies in London (historic)
Constituencies in the Parliament of England
1298 establishments in England
 Elections